There are at least 13 members of the bedstraw and madder family, Rubiaceae, found in Montana. Some of these species are exotics (not native to Montana) and some species have been designated as species of concern.
Catchweed bedstraw, Galium aparine
Baby's breath, Galium mollugo
Kelloggia, Kelloggia galioides
Low mountain bedstraw, Galium bifolium
Mexican bedstraw, Galium mexicanum
Northern bedstraw, Galium boreale
Piedmont-bedstraw, Galium pedemontanum
Small bedstraw, Galium trifidum
Galium trifidum subsp. columbianum
Galium trifidum subsp. trifidum
Galium trifidum subsp. subbiflorum
Sweet-scent bedstraw, Galium triflorum
Spring bedstraw, Galium verum

Further reading

See also
 List of dicotyledons of Montana

Notes

Rubiaceae
Flora of the Rocky Mountains
Lists of plants